is a passenger junction railway station located in the city of Higashiōmi, Shiga Prefecture, Japan. It is the main station in Higashiōmi city and one of the most important stations of Ohmi railway.

Lines
Yōkaichi Station is served by the Ohmi Railway Main Line (Koto Ohmi Line, Minakuchi Gamono Line), and is located 25.3 rail kilometers from the terminus of the line at Maibara Station. It is also a terminus of the Yōkaichi Line (Man-yō Akane Line) and is 9.3 kilometers from the opposing terminus of that line at Ōmi-Hachiman Station.

Station layout
The station consists of an island platform and a side platforms connected to the station building by a footbridge.

Platforms

Adjacent stations

History
Yōkaichi Station was opened on July 24, 1898. The station building was reconstructed in 1998. A museum was opened don the second floor of the station building in 2019.

Passenger statistics
In fiscal 2019, the station was used by an average of 2161 passengers daily (boarding passengers only).

Buses
"Ohmi Railway bus" for Notogawa Station, Eigen-ji and "Chokotto-bus" (municipal buses) depart and arrive from this station.

Surroundings
 Shopping Plaza Apia (Al Plaza Yokaichi)
 Shiga Prefectural Yokaichi High School
 Honmachi Shopping Arcade

See also
List of railway stations in Japan

References

External links

 Ohmi Railway official site 
Ohmi Railway Museum

Railway stations in Japan opened in 1898
Railway stations in Shiga Prefecture
Higashiōmi